Joshua Abrams (born January 18, 1986) is a former Canadian football cornerback. He was signed by the Packers as an undrafted free agent in 2008. He played college football at Ohio. After spending the 2008 season on the practice squad, he was signed to a future contract at the end of the year.

On February 2, 2010, Abrams signed with the Toronto Argonauts of the Canadian Football League, where he played in five games and recorded seven tackles. He was released by the Argonauts on June 28, 2011.

References

External links
 Ohio Bobcats bio
 Toronto Argonauts profile
 Just Sports Stats

1986 births
Living people
American football cornerbacks
American football running backs
Players of American football from Georgia (U.S. state)
Sportspeople from DeKalb County, Georgia
Green Bay Packers players
Ohio Bobcats football players
People from Dunwoody, Georgia
Players of Canadian football from Georgia (U.S. state)
Canadian football defensive backs
Canadian football linebackers
Toronto Argonauts players